Claudia Mahler (born 1969) is an Austrian academic who currently serves as an Independent Expert on the human rights of older persons at the United Nations Human Rights Council.

Career 
Mahler completed her doctoral degree in 2000. Same year, she was appointed Vice President of the Human Rights Commission for Tyrol and Vorarlberg and later became a consultant to OHCHR in Geneva and taught human rights law rising to the position of a visiting professor at the Alice Salomon University of Applied Sciences Berlin. From 2001 to 2009, Mahler conducted research at the Human Rights Centre of the University of Potsdam and was a senior researcher at the German Institute for Human Rights from 2010. She was appointed as an independent expert to the United Nations Human Rights Council in May 2020.

References 

Austrian academics
Austrian women
Austrian activists
1969 births
Living people
Human rights activists
Academic staff of the University of Potsdam